Events from the year 1666 in art.

Events
June 1–4 – Four Days' Battle, a naval battle of the Second Anglo-Dutch War at which Willem van de Velde the Elder is present and makes sketches.
A stay of three to five years at the Palazzo Mancini in Rome, at the expense of the King of France, is added to the Prix de Rome award.

Works

Sir Peter Lely
Barbara Palmer, Duchess of Cleveland, as St. Catherine of Alexandria (approximate date)
Flagmen of Lowestoft, portraits of English admirals (series completed at about this date)
Vermeer – The Art of Painting

Births
April 12 – Pierre Le Gros the Younger, French sculptor, active almost exclusively in Baroque Rome (died 1719)
April 17 – Johann Michael Feuchtmayer the Elder, German painter and copper engraver (died 1713)
August 12 – Antonio Balestra, Italian Rococo painter (died 1740)
September 4 – Anna Maria Ehrenstrahl, Swedish Baroque painter of allegories, portraits and group portraits (died 1729)
November 17 – Benedetto Luti, Italian painter of pastel portraits (died 1724)
November 28 – Magnus Berg, Norwegian painter, woodcarver, sculptor and non-fiction writer (died 1739)
date unknown
Ferdinando del Cairo, Italian painter (died 1748)
Giovanna Fratellini, Italian painter of small miniature portraits (died 1731)
Giovanni Felice Ramelli, Italian painter of portrait miniatures and abbot (died 1740)

Deaths

February 24 – Nicholas Lanier, English composer, singer, lutenist, painter and art collector (born 1588)
May 13 – Pier Francesco Mola, Italian painter of frescoes (born 1612)
June 29 – Mateo Cerezo, Spanish painter (born 1637)
August 26 – Frans Hals, Dutch painter (born c. 1580)
October – Jan Albertsz Rotius, Dutch portrait painter (born 1624)
December 8 – Dancker Danckerts, Dutch engraver and publisher (born 1634)
December 9 – Guercino, Italian Baroque painter (born 1591)
date unknown
Domenico Bruni, Italian painter, mainly active in Brescia (born 1600)
Giovanni Angelo Canini, Italian painter and engraver (born 1609)
Philip Fruytiers, Flemish painter (born 1627)
Sebastian Furck, German engraver (born 1589)
1666 or 1667 – Peter Snayers, Flemish battlefield painter (born 1592)

 
Years of the 17th century in art
1660s in art